The World Institute of Kimchi (WiKim) is an affiliate institution of  established in 2010 that specializes in research and development related to kimchi. The institute is located at 86 Gimchi-ro, Nam District, Gwangju.

History 

On July 15, 2009, the location of the institute was selected in Imam-dong, Nam District, Gwangju. On September 17, 2009, The World Institute of Kimchi was formed within the Ministry of Food, Agriculture, Forestry and Fisheries.
On December 23, 2009, The 132nd regular board meeting of the Industrial Technology Research Association approved the establishment of the World Kimchi Research Center affiliated with the Korea Food Research Institute. On January 1, 2010, The World Kimchi Research Institute was established and registered. On March 10, 2010, the opening ceremony of the World Kimchi Research Institute was held in the main auditorium of the Korea Food Research Institute.

On October 31, 2012, the institute's office building was moved to its current location. On March 23, 2013, The Ministry of Science, ICT and Future Planning changed the department in charge. Park Wan-soo who previously served as the acting-chairman was appointed the chairman of the World Institute of Kimchi. On July 26, 2017, the jurisdiction was placed under the Ministry of Science and ICT. On October 24, 2017, the World Institute of Kimchi was recognized as an internationally recognized testing agency (KOLAS). On January 30, 2018, it was designated as an excellent animal testing facility by the Ministry of Food and Drug Safety. On April 30, 2019, the World Institute of Kimchi designated as an agency for testing and inspection of food, etc. (self-quality consignment inspection) by the Gwangju Regional Food and Drug Administration.

Research field 

Microbial functional research, new process fermentation research, cultural convergence research, industrial technology development, hygiene safety, and analysis research.

Subdivisions 
R&D Headquarters
Microbial Functional Research Center
New Process Fermentation Research Center
Cultural Convergence Research Center
Industrial Technology Research Center
Hygiene Safety Analysis Center
Strategic Planning Division
Planning and Budget Office
Future Strategy Office
Small and Medium Business Support Office
Management Support Department
HR and Finance Team
Purchasing Computing Team
Safety Facility Management Team

References

External links 
World Institute of Kimchi website

Kimchi
Kimchi dishes
Food industry trade groups
Research institutes in South Korea
Research institutes established in 2010
Organizations based in Gwangju
2010 establishments in South Korea